Albéric Joseph Rodolphe Marie Robert Ghislain O'Kelly de Galway (17 May 1911, in Anderlecht – 3 October 1980, in Brussels) was a Belgian chess Grandmaster (1956), an International Correspondence Chess Grandmaster (1962), and the third ICCF World Champion in correspondence chess (1959–1962). He was also a chess writer.

Chess career
O'Kelly won the Belgian championships thirteen times between 1937 and 1959.  He placed first at Beverwijk 1946.  In 1947, he became one of Europe's leading players, having finished first at the 1947 European Zonal tournament at Hilversum, tied for first place with Pirc at Teplice Sanov, and tied for second at Venice.  The next year, O'Kelly finished first at São Paulo ahead of Eliskases and Rossetto.  He earned the title International Master (IM) in 1950, the first year the title was awarded.  He placed first at Dortmund 1951.  O'Kelly finished first at the round-robin Utrecht 1961 with 6½/9, followed by Karl Robatsch second with 6 points and Arthur Bisguier and Aleksandar Matanović tied for third and fourth with 5½. He took part in The Gijón International Chess Tournaments (1949 and 1956), achieving respectively 2nd and 4th places.

In 1958, he was awarded the Belgian decoration of the Golden Palm of the Order of the Crown, for his chess successes and the distinction he had brought to the nation.

O'Kelly was made an International Arbiter in 1962 and was the chief arbiter of the world championship matches between Tigran Petrosian and Boris Spassky in 1966 and 1969.  In 1974, he was the arbiter for the Moscow Karpov–Korchnoi match.

He spoke French, Dutch, German, English, Spanish, and Russian fluently, and also some Italian. He published many books and articles, often in languages other than French.  As a youth, he took lessons from the legendary Akiba Rubinstein.

Ancestry
O'Kelly was descended from John O'Kelly, an Irish-born British army officer who was granted a nobility title in 1720 in what was then the Austrian Low Countries. Consequently, he was often styled as 'Count O'Kelly de Galway', for example on the front cover of his 1965 book about Petrosian.

Legacy

The O'Kelly Variation in the Sicilian Defence: 1.e4 c5 2.Nf3 a6 is named after him.

Books

Notable games
Alberic O'Kelly de Galway vs Arnold Denker, Mar del Plata 1948, Spanish Game: Schliemann Defense, Dyckhoff Variation (C63), 1–0
Christian Poulsen vs Alberic O'Kelly de Galway, Dubrovnik olm 1950,  Sicilian Defense: O'Kelly Variation. Normal System (B28), 0–1
Alberic O'Kelly de Galway vs Jonathan Penrose, Olympiad 1962, Sicilian Defense: Paulsen, Bastrikov Variation (B47), ½–½
Robert James Fischer vs Alberic O'Kelly de Galway Havana CAP 1965, Spanish Game: Marshall Attack, Modern Variation (C89), ½–½

References
Notes

Bibliography

External links

 
 
 
 Biography 
 Visa with photo

1911 births
1980 deaths
Chess grandmasters
Chess Olympiad competitors
World Correspondence Chess Champions
Correspondence chess grandmasters
Chess double grandmasters
Belgian chess players
Belgian male writers
Sportspeople from Brussels
Chess writers
Chess arbiters
Chess theoreticians
Counts of Belgium
Belgian people of Irish descent
20th-century chess players